Timea Bacsinszky and Tathiana Garbin were the defending champions but chose not to participate this year.

Iveta Benešová and Barbora Záhlavová-Strýcová won the title beating Lucie Hradecká and Ekaterina Makarova in the final, 7–5, 6–3.

Seeds

Draw

Draw

References
 Main Draw

2011 Doubles
BGL Luxembourg Open - Doubles
2011 in Luxembourgian tennis